Uvarovsky (masculine), Uvarovskaya (feminine), or Uvarovskoye (neuter) may refer to:
Uvarovsky District, a district of Tambov Oblast, Russia
Uvarovsky (rural locality) (Uvarovskaya, Uvarovskoye), several rural localities in Russia